Martin "Marti" ten Kate (born 16 December 1958) is a retired long-distance runner from the Netherlands, who represented his native country at the 1988 Summer Olympics in Seoul, South Korea, where he finished in 9th place in the 10,000 metres (27:50.30), and 15th (02:14:53) in the marathon. Ten Kate won the Enschede Marathon twice (1987 and 1989).

He won the City-Pier-City Loop half marathon in the Hague four times a row (1987–1990).

Achievements

References

1958 births
Living people
Dutch male long-distance runners
Dutch male marathon runners
Athletes (track and field) at the 1988 Summer Olympics
Olympic athletes of the Netherlands
People from Steenwijkerland
Sportspeople from Overijssel